The 2002 Utah State Aggies football team represented Utah State University in the 2002 NCAA Division I-A football season. Utah State competed as an independent and played their home games in Romney Stadium.

Schedule

References

Utah State
Utah State Aggies football seasons
Utah State football